The SMU–Tulsa men's soccer rivalry is a college soccer rivalry between the SMU Mustangs men's soccer and the Tulsa Golden Hurricane men's soccer programs.

History 
The rivalry dates back to 1980 when the programs first played. SMU currently leads the series with a 33–14–5 record over Tulsa. With 52 matches played between the two sides, it is the most frequently played match between both opponents and has been an annual staple between the two programs since being part of the American Athletic Conference.

CollegeSoccerNews.com rated the soccer rivalry between SMU and Tulsa as the 14th greatest college soccer rivalry in the United States.

Game results

Conference membership

Honors

References 

College soccer rivalries in the United States
SMU Mustangs men's soccer
Tulsa Golden Hurricane men's soccer
1980 establishments in Oklahoma
1980 establishments in Texas